The Cycle: Frontier (formerly titled The Cycle) is a 2022 first-person shooter video game developed and published by Yager Development. Yager describes this game as a "competitive quest shooter" and labels it with the cross-genre "PvEvP", a combination of player versus environment and player versus player. The game was released on Windows via early access in August 2019, and was launched in full on June 8, 2022.

Gameplay 
The Cycle: Frontier is a first-person shooter, with a play style that's been compared to Escape from Tarkov. Set in a future where interstellar travel is possible, the game focuses on a group of humans living on a space station called the Prospect Station. Players take on the role of prospectors; mercenaries tasked with the job of landing on a dangerous planet called Fortuna III. Players have to compete against each other, as well as the unforgiving environment, scavenging loot and completing quests before extracting. Any equipment not insured will be permanently lost in case of death. Three major factions, the Independent Civilian Advisory (ICA), Osiris, and Korolev offer contracts they want the player to complete. Players have the option of dropping solo, in a duo or in trios; and game instances last six hours before refreshing.

The Cycle: Frontier launched with two maps, and has features including crafting, customising load-out and character appearance, as well as a "battle pass" system.

Development 
The initial development plans started shortly after Yager had finished working on Dreadnought. The Cycle: Frontier ended up being revealed at Gamescom 2018, eight months after. The goal was to combine the narrative with social dynamics. It was released into early access on the Epic Games Store in August 2019.

The Steam release initially set for December 2020 was delayed to some time in early 2021 due to changes in development plans and being hindered by the COVID-19 pandemic.

Reception 

The Cycle: Frontier received "mixed or average" reviews, according to review aggregator Metacritic.

PC Gamer lamented its formulaic design, writing, "Without any kind of narrative hook or any kind of subversiveness at all, and little moment to moment reward, a list of unlocks can't possibly compel me to invest that kind of time."

It gained popularity when played by Summit1g on Twitch.

References

External links 
 
 

Video games containing battle passes
Video games developed in Germany
Unreal Engine games
Action video games
Early access video games
Windows games
Windows-only games
Video games set on fictional planets
2022 video games
Yager Development games